Members of the New South Wales Legislative Council who served in the 47th Parliament were elected at the 1978 and 1981 elections. One third of the council faced re-election at each general election, however as a result of the 1981 referendum the maximum terms were extended from a maximum of nine to twelve years. The 14 members who had been indirectly elected in 1976 served an eight-year term and did not face re-election until 1984, the 15 members elected in 1978 did not face re-election until 1988, while the 15 members elected in 1981 did not face re-election until 1992. The President was Johno Johnson.

References

Members of New South Wales parliaments by term
20th-century Australian politicians